Frederik Christian Vilhelm Christesen (4 July 1822 – 29 December 1899) was a Danish goldsmith and silversmith. His firm was from 1858 based at Amaliegade 11 in Copenhagen.

Early life and education
Christesen was born on 4 July 1822 in Copenhagen, the son of helmsman Anders (or Hans) Christensen (1792-1828) and Vilhelmine Magdalene Augusta Grandjean (1796-1849). The mother moved the family to Slagelse following the father's death in 1825. Christesen was apprenticed to Jacob Kjølstrup in his new home town. On completing his apprenticeship in 1843, he travelled to Bremen as a journeyman to work for Wilkens & Salme.

Career
In 1846, he returned to Slagelse and took over his old master's workshop. In 1856, he moved to Copenhagen where he was initially based at Løvstræde 122 (old number). In 1857, he obtained a license to start a silver and gold pressing factory. It was the first enterprise of its kind in the country and soon grew to considerable size. In 1858, he moved his enterprise to a building in the courtyard of Amaliegade 11. His products were initially sold through other gold smiths but in 1865 he opened his own shop. His business was mainly based on industrial mass production but his involvement in Kunstflidslotteriet (founded 1861) and the associated artists resulted in a number of precious show pieces for which he received recognition on a number of exhibitions in Denmark and abroad.

Personal life
 
Christesen was on 28 June 1846 in Bremen married to Luise Sophie Dorothea Pape (25 August 1825 - 10 August 1882). She was a daughter of mailman and former distiller Hermann Pape (1790-1838) and Dorothea Margarethe Plöger (1799-1865).

In 1874, Christesen purchased Amaliegade 11. He heightened the building facing the street to four storeys and constructed a short perpendicular side wing on its rear. He lived with his family in the apartment on the first floor. He died on 29 December 1899 and is buried in the Cemetery of Holmen.

Legacy
Christesen's factory was internationally renowned for its 'Ancient Norse' style jewellery, copying archeological objects from the Bronze Age to the medieval period. The company's work was popular in England where it was copied by local goldsmiths.

Further reading
 Rykind-Erikse, Kirsten: Støbte figurer og drageslyng. En produktions- og socialhistorie om juvelér- og sølvvarefabrikant Vilhelm Christesen, 1850-19001- Hostprosle Meddelelser om København,

References

External links
Source

Danish goldsmiths
Danish silversmiths
19th-century Danish artisans
Artisans from Copenhagen
Danish company founders
1822 births
1899 deaths